The 1921 Louisville Brecks season was their inaugural season in the National Football League. The team finished 0–2 against league teams, and tied for eighteenth place in the league.

Schedule

Games in italics are against non-NFL teams and do not contribute to the league standings.

Standings

References

Louisville Brecks and Colonels (NFL) seasons
Louisville Brecks
Louisville Brecks
National Football League winless seasons